Penna Ahobilam is place near Anantapur, Andhra Pradesh, India, 12 km from Uravakonda and 36 km from Anantapur. It is well-linked by road with frequent bus service.

References

External links

Villages in Anantapur district